Matt Holloway (born 16 January 1985) is New Zealand born rugby union player. He played for London Wasps A in the United Kingdom after playing for Counties Manukau Steelers in the 2009 Air New Zealand Cup on loan from Southland who he played for in 2007 and 2008. He is still currently contracted with the Southland Stags but is likely to be released from his current contract so he is able to continue playing rugby in England. He also played for the 2005 New Zealand Under-21s who finished third at the 2005 Under 21 Rugby World Championship.

References

External links
 Steelers Profile

1985 births
Living people
New Zealand rugby union players
Rugby union hookers
Rugby union players from Christchurch